Bogdan Vadimovich Mishukov (born 5 February 1997) is a Russian football player.

Club career
He made his debut in the Russian Football National League for FC Khimki on 17 March 2019 in a game against FC Rotor Volgograd.

References

External links
 
 Profile by Russian Football National League
 

1997 births
Footballers from Moscow
Living people
Russian footballers
Association football midfielders
FC Ural Yekaterinburg players
Leixões S.C. players
FC Khimki players
Russian expatriate footballers
Expatriate footballers in Portugal